Molanosa is a small isolated community located in Northern Saskatchewan, approximately 70 kilometres south of La Ronge near the northern end of Montreal Lake. It is considered the geographic centre of Saskatchewan.

The name is an acronym for Montreal Lake, Northern Saskatchewan.

See also
List of communities in Saskatchewan
List of geographic acronyms and initialisms

References

External links

Division No. 18, Unorganized, Saskatchewan
Unincorporated communities in Saskatchewan